Stanisław Ossowski (Lipno, 22 May 18977 November 1963, Warsaw) was one of Poland's most important sociologists.

He held professorships at Łódź University (1945–47) and Warsaw University (1947–63).

Life
Ossowski first contributed to logic and aesthetics before moving on to sociology. He studied philosophy at the University of Warsaw, his teachers were i.a. Tadeusz Kotarbiński, Jan Łukasiewicz and Władysław Tatarkiewicz. He also studied in Paris (Collège de France), in Rome and in London. He took part in the 1920 war. Doctorate (Analysis of the notion of a sign, 1925) wrote to Tadeusz Kotarbiński at the University of Warsaw. He took part in the September campaign. He spent the occupation in Lviv and Warsaw. He taught sociology at an underground university.

He was a proponent of humanistic sociology and antinaturalism, differentiating between the natural sciences and the social sciences. He believed that all phenomena of social life had a consciousness aspect. For example, a social bond, especially ethnic or national, is the result of imaginations and beliefs. Their pathological forms, such as racism or chauvinism, were strongly denounced by Ossowski, while praising positive manifestations such as patriotism ("private homeland" or "ideological homeland").

Ossowski was one of the greatest intellectual and moral authorities in post-war Poland, he has had a strong influence on Polish sociologists, including Zygmunt Bauman and Jerzy Szacki.

In 1949 Ossowski was a founding member, and from 1959 to 1962 vice-president, of the International Sociological Association. In 1956 he was a founding member of the reactivated Polish Sociological Association and became its first president (1957–63).

Ossowski was married to Maria Ossowska, a fellow sociologist and social philosopher.

Maria Ossowska and Stanisław Ossowski are considered among the founders of the field of "science of science" due to their authorship of a seminal 1935 paper, "The Science of Science."

In 1951 he was removed from teaching. He was returned to the right to conduct classes after Polish October 1956.

An indication of the esteem in which he was held by certain sections of Polish society is a statue of him erected in Central Warsaw.

Important works 
 U podstaw estetyki (1933)
 "The Science of Science" ("Nauka o nauce", 1935)
 Więź społeczna i dziedzictwo krwi (1939)
 Struktura klasowa w społecznej świadomości (1957)
 O osobliwościach nauk społecznych (1962)
 O ojczyźnie i narodzie (1984)

See also
List of Poles
Logology (science of science)
Robert K. Merton

Notes

References
Bohdan Walentynowicz, ed., Polish Contributions to the Science of Science, Dordrecht, D. Reidel Publishing Company, 1982, .

External links
The Sociological Ideas of Stanislaw Ossowski, Journal of Classical Sociology, vol. 6, no. 3, 2006, pp. 283–309 (abstract)
Class Structure in the Social Consciousness   (New York, Free Press of Glencoe, 1963)

1897 births
1963 deaths
Polish sociologists
20th-century Polish philosophers
Academic staff of the University of Warsaw
People from Lipno, Lipno County